Ryan McHenry (13 December 1987 – 2 May 2015) was a Scottish film director best known for the film Zombie Musical in which he received a nomination for the Best Director accolade at the 2011 British Academy Scotland New Talent Awards.

Zombie Musical would be adapted by McHenry and Alan McDonald into the 2017 feature film Anna and the Apocalypse, which would ultimately be released after McHenry's death.

Life and career 
Ryan McHenry was born in Dumfries in Scotland. In 2011 he wrote and directed the film Zombie Musical. The film, which was a joint adventure between Haphazard Media and Black Camel Pictures tells the story of Anna who starts at a new school in a small Scottish town. She is forced to deal with a zombie outbreak set to catchy songs. The film was a critical success and earned McHenry a nomination at the 2011 British Academy Scotland New Talent Awards.

In 2013, McHenry created the video series Ryan Gosling Won't Eat His Cereal. The series which started on Vine centred on a gimmick where McHenry attempted to feed cereal to a shot of Ryan Gosling on screen. Just before the spoon reached his mouth the actor would turn away as if he was rejecting the food. The videos became an internet sensation and McHenry went from having 8 followers to over 200,000 on his channel. The series also attracted attention from Entertainment Online and the Huffington Post. It wouldn't be until April 2015 when Gosling himself acknowledged the video series and tweeted 'I actually love cereal.'

In late 2013, McHenry started experiencing a painful lump in his leg and consulted a doctor who diagnosed it as osteosarcoma that had spread to his lungs. He announced the news on his Twitter page with an upbeat spin saying

During his chemotherapy sessions, McHenry continued to tweet and often turned to his followers for support and inspiration. On one occasion he called upon his followers to photoshop a selfie he had taken on his hospital bed. He was overwhelmed by the creative response of his followers.

Death 
After initial signs that McHenry had beaten cancer, he returned to work in July 2014 after a long course of chemotherapy. The cancer returned, and on 2 May 2015 he died. Two days before his death he had tweeted, in his typical deadpan humour: 

Upon the news of his death, Vine tweeted their own tribute to McHenry saying: 

On 5 May, Ryan Gosling created his very own Vine channel in order to post a tribute to McHenry. The clip showed Gosling pouring a bowl of cereal, saluting the camera with his spoon then proceeding to eat the cereal.

Filmography

Awards

References

External links 

Ryan McHenry Vine Channel
Ryan Gosling Vine Tribute to McHenry

1987 births
2015 deaths
British film directors
Deaths from cancer in Scotland
Scottish film directors
Scottish screenwriters
Alumni of the Edinburgh College of Art
People from Dumfries
British male screenwriters
Vine (service) celebrities
Shorty Award winners